FTW or F.T.W. may refer to:

US-city-related 
 Fort Worth area:
 Fort Worth, Texas, the city itself
 Fort Worth Central Station
 Fort Worth Meacham International Airport
 Fort Wayne, Indiana

Songs
 "F.T.W." (The Vines song)
 "FTW" (Lets Be Friends song)
 "Fuck the World (F.T.W.)", by Turbonegro
 "F.T.W.", by MC Chris from Dungeon Master of Ceremonies
 "F.T.W.", by Sword from  Metalized
 "F.T.W.", by Tiger Army from  Tiger Army II: Power of Moonlite
 "F.T.W.", by Xiu Xiu from Women As Lovers
 "F.T.W.", by Deez Nuts from Stay True

Other 
 F.T.W. (film) (1994)
 FTW Championship, a professional wrestling championship
 .ftw, extension for Family Tree Maker files
 Fucking Trans Women, a 2010 zine by Mira Bellwether
 Furious Truckstop Waitresses, a Tucson Roller Derby team

See also
 Fuck the World (disambiguation)
 For the win (Internet slang)
 For the Win (2010 novel) by Cory Doctorow 
 Fare Thee Well (disambiguation)